Akira Fujita (藤田 明 , 1 January 1908 - 29 May 2001) was a Japanese male water polo player. He was a member of the Japan men's national water polo team. He competed with the team at the 1932 Summer Olympics.

References

External links
 

1908 births
2001 deaths
Japanese male water polo players
Water polo players at the 1932 Summer Olympics
Olympic water polo players of Japan
People from Hiroshima
20th-century Japanese people
21st-century Japanese people
Presidents of the Japan Swimming Federation